U-4 may refer to one of the following German submarines:

 , was a Type U 3 submarine launched in 1909 and served in the First World War as a training submarine; scrapped in 1919
 During the First World War, Germany also had these submarines with similar names:
 , a Type UB I submarine launched in 1915 and sunk on 15 August 1915
 , a Type UC I submarine launched in 1915 and scuttled on 5 October 1918
 , a Type IIA submarine that served in the Second World War and was stricken in 1944 and scrapped in 1945
 , a Type 205 submarine of the Bundesmarine that was launched in 1962 and scrapped in 1974

U-4 or U-IV may also refer to:
 , a U-3 class submarine of the Austro-Hungarian Navy

Submarines of Germany